Mesoptyelus is a genus of true bugs belonging to the family Aphrophoridae.

The species of this genus are found in Japan.

Species
Species:

Mesoptyelus arisanus 
Mesoptyelus auropilosus 
Mesoptyelus coreanus 
Mesoptyelus fascialis 
Mesoptyelus iranicus 
Mesoptyelus karenkonis 
Mesoptyelus nengyosanus 
Mesoptyelus nigrifrons 
Mesoptyelus okamotonis 
Mesoptyelus yagonis

References

Aphrophoridae